The Rickenbacker 4001 is an electric bass that was manufactured by Rickenbacker as a two-pickup "deluxe" version of their first production bass, the single-pickup model 4000. This design, created by  Roger Rossmeisl, was manufactured between 1961 and 1981, when it was replaced by an updated version dubbed the Rickenbacker 4003. Variant models of the 4001 include the 4001S, 4001LH, 1999 (European model), 4001V63 (reissue), 4001CS (a limited edition series based on Chris Squire's 1965 British model RM1999) and the 4001C64 and 4001C64S: the C Series is a recreation of Paul McCartney's left-handed 4001S with a reversed headstock. There are also Al Cisneros (4003 AC) and Lemmy Kilmister (4004 LK) signature versions of the instrument.

Construction
The 4001 model features a neck-through construction, a full-wood body, fretboard with metal strings (originally flat-wound, though many players replaced them with round-wounds), twin truss rods, triangle inlays, two pickups, two volume and two tone dials, selector switch, and wiring for Rick-O-Sound (standard after 1971). Rickenbacker also produced six-string and 12 string guitars and a short-scale bass, the 3000 model. The bridge system is a relatively unusual design, both in aesthetics and in function, featuring removable saddles, as well as a compartment designed to hold a foam mute.

The 4001S (and 1999) model varies in its use of dot inlays, and unbound neck construction. The Rickenbacker 4003, which replaced the 4001, differs in the truss rod design and introduces a fret wire that better withstands the wear from round-wound strings (fast fret wear was a common complaint for many years, and Rickenbacker strived to address the issue). The pickups are also higher in output, and the bridge pickup, a so-called "horseshoe" pickup, was entirely remodelled, featuring a more conventional design, although the "horseshoe", albeit removable is still part of the construction, for aesthetic purposes. More recent 4003 models also feature a push-pull switch on one of the tone knobs, which diminishes the output of the pickups, to more closely resemble the original 4001 tone. Other features remained similar to its forebear.

Rickenbacker has in recent years also produced a five-string model, featuring a more conventional bridge system, smaller Schaller machine heads and distinctive, asymmetrical pickups. It retains the Rickenbacker's signature 33" scale length, an unusual design for a five-string instrument. Between the years 1993 and 2018 Rickenbacker also manufactured a streamlined model, named the 4004, that used the 4001's trademark shape but featured smaller pickups, a simplified control layout, a more conventional bridge system and eschewed the use of aesthetic details such as binding or a pickguard.

Notable players

 Al Cisneros of Sleep and OM
 Andy Warren
 Audun Laading of Her's
 Becky Baldwin of Fury, touring bassist for Mercyful Fate
 Ben Wahamki of The Lumineers
 Bob Hardy of Franz Ferdinand
 Bruce Foxton of The Jam
 Buddy Zabala of the Pinoy band Eraserheads
 Charles Michael Parks Jr. of All Them Witches
 Chris Squire of Yes
 Chris Taylor of Grizzly Bear
 Chris Wolstenholme of Muse
 Chuck Panozzo of Styx
 Cliff Burton of Metallica
 Dan Maines of Clutch
 David Paton of Pilot and The Alan Parsons Project
 Don Schiff
 Dougie Thomson of Supertramp
 Dušan Kojić of Šarlo akrobata and Disciplina kičme
 Fabio Pignatelli of Goblin
 Fred Turner of Bachman-Turner Overdrive
 Geddy Lee of Rush
 Geezer Butler of Black Sabbath
 Glenn Hughes of Deep Purple, Trapeze, and Black Country Communion
Glen Matlock  of Sex Pistols
 Graham Gouldman of 10cc
 Göran Lagerberg of Tages and Kebnekajse
 Haruko Haruhara, fictional character from the anime series FLCL
 Heidi Rodewald of Wednesday Week and Passing Strange
 Inge Johansson of Against Me!
 Jack Lawrence of The Raconteurs and The Dead Weather
 Jesse F. Keeler of Death From Above 1979 and MSTRKRFT
 Jim Smith of Cardiacs
 Joey DeMaio of Manowar
 John Bentley of Squeeze
 John Deacon of Queen
 John Entwistle of The Who
 Jon Camp of Renaissance
 Josephine Wiggs of The Breeders
 Julie Doiron of Eric's Trip
 Kira Roessler of Black Flag
 Lemmy Kilmister of Motörhead
 Lou Barlow of Dinosaur Jr.
 Mario Mutis of Los Jaivas
 Martin Gordon of Sparks and Radio Stars
 Martin Turner of Wishbone Ash
 Matt Gatera of The Seagulls
 Maurice Gibb of the Bee Gees
 Mike Mills of R.E.M.
 Mike Rutherford of Genesis
 Paul D'Amour of Tool
 Paul Gray of The Damned, Eddie & The Hot Rods and UFO
 Peter Cetera of Chicago
 Paul McCartney of Wings and The Beatles
 Paul Simonon of The Clash
 Paul Wilson of Snow Patrol
 Pete Trewavas of Marillion
 Pete Quaife of The Kinks
 Phil Lynott of Thin Lizzy
 Prakash John
 Prescott Niles of the Knack
 Randy Meisner of Eagles and Poco
 Rick James
 Roger Glover of Deep Purple, Rainbow and Episode Six
 Roger Waters of Pink Floyd
 Scott Pilgrim, fictional character from the Scott Pilgrim series
 Scott Reeder of Kyuss
 Simon Gallup of The Cure
 Simon Johns of Stereolab
 Stu Cook of Creedence Clearwater Revival, with a 4001 featured prominently on the Bayou Country album's cover photograph
 Timothy B. Schmit of Eagles and Poco
 Tommy Stinson of The Replacements and formerly Guns ‘N Roses
 Tony James of Generation X
 Tracy Pew of The Birthday Party

References

External links

 Rickenbacker International Corporation

Bass guitars
4001
1961 musical instruments
The Beatles' musical instruments